Institute Monte Rosa, commonly referred to as Monte Rosa or Monte, is a private, international boarding school, in Montreux, Switzerland.

Overview
Since 1874, Monte Rosa has been offering a wide range of academic programs in both general subject areas and intensive language studies, in a family-like atmosphere conducive to learning. Small classes and personalized instruction designed for optimum results, vital interaction between teachers and students, and principles based on genuine educational value: these are the ingredients that make up a climate in which school life is challenging and invigorating. On-going dialogue and the pleasure of accomplishment fashion the personality of students expected to address tomorrow's realities.

History
The International School Monte Rosa was founded in 1874 by the Essarts family under the name of ‘Institut des Essarts’. At the time, the school was made for girls only, mainly coming from the Netherlands. The school adopted its current name in the 1960s, and Monte Rosa became co-educational in 1964. The Gademann family has been running and leading the international school ever since then.

Academic curriculum

Academic year programs
The academic program of the Anglo-American section is strongly college-preparatory. Students planning to attend American universities are prepared for College Board examinations and receive the high school diploma on successful completion of 12th grade. Specially designed courses are available for entry to business or other colleges.

The postgraduate year offers mature students intensive business, economics and computer studies. The important Department of Business Studies offers a full Trans-Academic program in English:
•Junior and High School (Grades 6-13)
•Cambridge exams, TOEFL, College Board exams
•Diplômes d'etudes en langue francaise DELF
•University-preparatory courses
•Business Studies
•Modern languages: French, German, Spanish, Italian and optional Russian and Chinese (Mandarin)

Short-term holiday courses
At Monte Rosa, even the holidays involve the joy of learning: a special and very popular feature offered by the school is its summer and winter Swiss holidays, "an international lifestyle experience", where students can learn to live with girls and boys from other nations through sports, outdoor activities and language training (French, German or English).

Summer holiday courses (June - August)
A great variety of programs allow students to obtain self-assurance and to understand and appreciate each other. In the morning, students may choose one or two languages and are placed in the various classes according to their previous knowledge. Afternoons are set-aside for active leisure, cultural events and a variety of sports activities.

Teaching boys and girls of different nationalities to live side by side in a spirit of democracy, through sports, open air activities and language courses: that is the main aim of the holiday camps.

Leisure activities: Football, volleyball, tennis, athletics, fitness training, mini-golf, archery, waterskiing, sailing, windsurfing, basketball, badminton, mountain biking, horseback riding, jogging, banana boat, rafting, concerts, ballets, arts and crafts, cooking classes, visits to museums and art galleries, disco evenings, etc.

Winter holiday courses (January - February)
In the morning, students may choose one or two languages and are placed in the various classes according to their previous knowledge. Afternoons are set-aside for active leisure, cultural events and a variety of sports activities. Ski and snowboard lessons are available for beginners, intermediate and advanced skiers. The program offers a wide choice of ski resorts such as: Les Diablerets - Villars - Verbier - Gstaad - Crans Montana - Morgins - Rochers-de-Naye - Leysin - Ovronnaz - Col des Mosses - Champéry - Les Crosets.

Facilities
The school is housed in a stately nineteenth-century mansion in Territet-Montreux on the shores of Lake Geneva and has a panoramic view across the lake to the snow-capped Savoy Alps in France. It is located a 1 hour drive east from Geneva International Airport. The climate is temperate and the pleasant environment conducive to healthy living and studying.

A comfortable campus of 6,000m2 with sports facilities on site (tennis, football, basketball, volleyball). Boys and girls benefit from separate housing. The school provides accommodation in double or triple rooms (with single rooms available upon request).

Tuition fees
As of 2014/15, the annual boarding and academic fees are CHF 61,000 (approximately US$65,000), without extra-fees such as sports, laundry etc.

References

External links
 

Private schools in Switzerland
Boarding schools in Switzerland
Educational institutions established in 1874
Co-educational boarding schools
1874 establishments in Switzerland
Montreux
Buildings and structures in the canton of Vaud